Elio Díaz (born 17 December 1962) is a Venezuelan boxer. He competed in the men's welterweight event at the 1980 Summer Olympics. At the 1980 Summer Olympics, he lost to Lucas Msomba of Tanzania.

References

1962 births
Living people
Venezuelan male boxers
Olympic boxers of Venezuela
Boxers at the 1980 Summer Olympics
Place of birth missing (living people)
Welterweight boxers